Edgard Madi or Edgard Amine Madi (born 23 March 1956 in Beit Mery, Lebanon) is the bishop of the Maronite Catholic Eparchy of Our Lady of Lebanon of São Paulo in Brazil.

Biography

Edgard Madi ended his high school and began his studies at Collège Sagesse in Beirut and ecclesiastical studies at Holy Spirit University of Kaslik, Lebanon, between 1977 and 1981. Ordained a priest on August 14, 1983, Madi moved to Boston in the United States where he majored in Education between 1988 and 1991. During his priesthood Madi held the following positions: 1983 to 1984 he was General secretary of the Maronite Synod of Bishops in Beirut; parish priest in Santa Tereza in Mansurieh in Lebanon from 1984 to 1988; priest in the Mar Mikhael Parish in Beirut and Latin Church in Boston from 1988 to 1991.

Between 1991 and 2001, he spent several weeks in Brazil. He speaks Arabic, Portuguese, French and English.

Returning to Holy Spirit University of Kaslik, he obtained a Ph.D. in Philosophy of Education in 2001. Madi was also director in High School for five years and Supervisor of Studies for 10 years; he is also student of Dialogue among Religions, especially among Christian and Islamic religions.

Edgard Madi was appointed bishop to the Maronite Eparchy of São Paulo on October 14, 2006, and was ordained Bishop on November 26, 2006 in Bkerki, the seat of the Maronite Patriarchate in Lebanon by Maronite Patriarch of Antioch, Cardinal Nasrallah Boutros Sfeir, being his co-consecrators Paul Youssef Matar, Maronite Archbishop of Beirut, and Joseph Mahfouz, OLM, former bishop of the Maronite Catholic Eparchy of Our Lady of Lebanon of São Paulo. The possession of the See of the Maronite Bishopric in São Paulo took place on December 10, 2006 with the presence of Bishop Boulos Mattar - Maronite bishop of Beirut and Bishop Emilio Saade - Maronite Bishop of Batroun. Bishop Edgard Madi replaced Bishop Joseph Mahfouz, who remained for 16 years ahead of the Maronite Archbishopric of Brazil.

Edgar Madi is an honorary citizen of São Paulo (city).

References

External links
 http://www.catholic-hierarchy.org/bishop/bmadie.html
 http://www.igrejamaronita.org.br
 http://www.apostolische-nachfolge.de/ernennung_2006.htm

1956 births
Eastern Catholic bishops in Brazil
Living people
Lebanese Eastern Catholic bishops
Lebanese emigrants to Brazil
21st-century Maronite Catholic bishops